Silver Strand bikeway  bicycle and pedestrian path in the San Diego area of California. it is part of the larger Bayshore Bikeway which begins at the USS Midway Museum. The bikeway travels from Ferry Landing Marketplace to Imperial Beach at sea level with no elevation gain, providing a relatively easy ride. An entry point and parking area is located at Ferry Landing Marketplace.

Description
The bikeway path travels from Ferry Landing Marketplace to Glorietta Boulevard to Silver Strand bikeway.

Route
It was built along the former right of way of the Coronado Beltline Railroad.

Ownership
Bike path quality in the City of San Diego is coordinated by SANDAG (San Diego Association of Governments).

See also

List of San Diego bike paths - includes information about class I, II, and III bike paths
List of Los Angeles bike paths

References

Best Rail Trails California: More Than 70 Rail Trails Throughout the State - Tracy Salcedo-Chourre
Best Bike Paths of the Southwest: Safe, Scenic and Traffic-Free Bicycling - Wendy Williams

External links
Route map with detailed pictures
Efgh.com San Diego and North County Red Routes website
signonsandiego.com's article about Silver Strand bikeway
sunset.com's article about Silver Strand bikeway
efgh.com's article about Silver Strand bikeway and other Coronado/Imperial routes
, alternate route made by a runner

Bike paths in San Diego
Transportation in California
Coronado, California